Ayşe Sultan ("the living one" or "womanly"; died  1680) was the Haseki of Sultan Murad IV of the Ottoman Empire.

Life
Ayşe’s real name and origin are unknown. She most likely appeared at the harem by the end of 1628 and soon became the sultan’s only favorite. She most likely appeared at the harem in the 1626 and soon became the sultan’s favorite, but she never was his only concubine. However, it is not known how many and/or which of Murad IV's children she was the mother.  

Privy Purse registers the presence of Ayşe as Murad's only Haseki until the very end of Murad's seventeen-year reign, when a second concubine, with the very high salary of 2.751 coin a day (but reduced to 2,000 after seven months), appeared. According to historian Leslie Peirce, this woman would have been Murad's second Haseki. However, other historians disagree that this second concubine officially held the title of Haseki. 

In 1633 Murad raised Ayşe's stipend to 2,000 aspers a day, where it remained throughout his reign. The increase was most likely linked to a general increase in stipends throughout the palace during Murad's reign, described by Koçi Bey, and was accompanied by a marked growth in the size of the harem. These changes were probably an aspect of Murad's dramatic assertion of personal control of government after nine years of his mother's regency.

After Murad IV’s death, Ayşe, like his other concubines, was sent out of the Topkapı Palace. The last mentioning of her receiving the stipend was in 1679/1680 and it is very probable that she died around that time.

In popular culture
In the TV series Muhteşem Yüzyıl: Kösem, Ayşe is portrayed by Turkish actress  Leyla Feray. In the series, she is the mother of Şehzade Ahmed, Hanzade Sultan and Kaya Sultan. Her death is different from reality: she commits suicide with her children except Kaya years before Murad's death.

References

1680 deaths
17th-century consorts of Ottoman sultans